Island Assembly elections were held in Nevis on 22 January 2013 to elect five members of the Nevis Island Assembly. 

The result was a win for the Concerned Citizens' Movement (CCM), led by Vance Amory, which won three of the five seats. The opposition Nevis Reformation Party (NRP) won two seats.

Results

By parish

References

Nevis
Nevis
Elections in Saint Kitts and Nevis